Kelvin Pius John (born 10 June 2003) is a Tanzanian professional footballer who plays for Belgian side Genk and the Tanzania national team.

Career

As a youth player, John joined Brooke House College.

Career statistics

International

References

2003 births
Living people
People from Morogoro Region
Tanzanian footballers
Tanzanian expatriate footballers
Tanzania youth international footballers
Tanzania international footballers
Association football forwards
K.R.C. Genk players
Tanzanian expatriate sportspeople in England
Expatriate footballers in England
Tanzanian expatriate sportspeople in Belgium
Expatriate footballers in Belgium
Challenger Pro League players
Jong Genk players